Palicourea lobbii is a species of plant in the family Rubiaceae. It is endemic to Ecuador.

The plant is named after William Lobb (1809 – 1864), the English plant collector.

References

latifolia
Endemic flora of Ecuador
Vulnerable plants
Taxonomy articles created by Polbot